The Gentleman Adventurer is Ian McNabb's 6th solo album and the first to contain no single releases.

Track listing
 "Nothin' But Time" [2:52]
 "Ain't No Way to Behave" [4:22]
 "An Honest Mistake" [4:42]
 "May and December" [3:48]
 "All Things to Everyone" [4:28]
 "Lady by Degrees" [4:37]
 "Other People" [3:33]
 "Gulf Coast Rockin'" [3:45]
 "German Soldier's Helmet Circa 1943" [3:50]
 "The Things You Do" [3:08]
 "The Human Heart and How it Works" [3:24]
 "Hurricane Elaine" [6:13]
 "Pampered Pop Star Millionaire Miserablist Blue"s [2:48]
 "The Prize" [5:20]

References

2002 albums
Ian McNabb albums